Coenraad Henrik Dillen (5 October 1926 – 24 July 1990) was a Dutch footballer who primarily played for PSV as well as the Dutch national side. He holds the record of most goals scored in an Eredivisie season.

Club career
Dillen started his senior career at PSV, but returned to childhood club Brabantia, before joining PSV once more for a prolific period. Nicknamed Het Kanon (the cannon), his goal tally of 43 in the inaugural 1956/57 Eredivisie season remains the highest score by an individual in the Eredivisie.  He scored twenty goals in a nine-match period between 27 January and 31 March 1957. He finished his career at Helmondia '55.

International career
Dillen made his debut for the Netherlands in a May 1954 friendly match against Switzerland and earned a total of 5 caps, scoring 4 goals. His final international was a March 1957 FIFA World Cup qualification match against Luxembourg.

Personal life
After retiring from playing he spent a two-year spell as manager of amateur side RKSV Nuenen. His brother Cor Dillen was a director and CFO for Philips.

He died in 1990 of a heart-attack in Zeeland, aged 63. In 2003, a statue was erected in his honour at the PSV stadium. His wife Mien continued to work in their cigarette store after his death.

References

External links
 
 
 CV Coen Dillen 
 Player profile at VoetbalStats.nl

1926 births
1990 deaths
Footballers from Eindhoven
Association football forwards
Dutch footballers
Netherlands international footballers
PSV Eindhoven players
Helmond Sport players
Eredivisie players